Nodar Malkhazovich Kavtaradze (born 2 January 1993) is a Russian professional footballer who plays for Georgian side Torpedo Kutaisi.

Club career
He made his debut in the Russian Second Division for FC Lokomotiv-2 Moscow on 22 April 2012 in a game against FC Volga Tver.

He made his Russian Football National League debut for FC Tyumen on 6 July 2014 in a game against FC Volgar Astrakhan.

Honours
Torpedo Kutaisi
Georgian Cup: 2022

References

External links
 Career summary by sportbox.ru  
 
 

1993 births
Russian people of Georgian descent
Living people
Russian footballers
Association football forwards
FC Tyumen players
FC Lokomotiv Moscow players
FC Dila Gori players
FC Torpedo Kutaisi players
FC Dinamo Tbilisi players
FC Saburtalo Tbilisi players
Mezőkövesdi SE footballers
Erovnuli Liga players
Nemzeti Bajnokság I players
Russian expatriate footballers
Expatriate footballers in Georgia (country)
Expatriate footballers in Hungary
Expatriate sportspeople from Georgia (country) in Hungary